Nazilli Belediyespor is the local football team for city of Nazilli in Turkey. They are currently playing in the TFF Second League.

History 
Nazilli Belediyespor founded in 1984. At the beginning, the club's kit colours were yellow and navy blue, but due to request of supporters in the city, colours changed as white and black. The team strolled between TFF Second and Third Leagues for years.

Rivals
The club has Aydınspor as a local rival.

Current squad

References

External links
Nazilli Belediyespor on TFF.org

 
Sport in Nazilli
Football clubs in Turkey
Association football clubs established in 1984
1984 establishments in Turkey